Llanfair-yng-Nghornwy is a village in Anglesey, in north-west Wales.

See also 
St Mary's Church, Llanfair-yng-Nghornwy

References

Villages in Anglesey
Cylch-y-Garn